The  is a mythological river in Japanese Buddhist tradition similar to the Chinese concept of Huang Quan (Yellow Springs), Hindu concept of the Vaitarani and Greek concept of the Styx. 

Before reaching the afterlife, the souls of the deceased must cross the river by one of three crossing points: a bridge, a ford, or a stretch of deep, snake-infested waters. The weight of one's offenses while alive determines which path an individual must take. It is believed that a toll of six mon must be paid before a soul can cross the river, a belief reflected in Japanese funerals when the necessary fee is placed in the casket with the dead.

The Sanzu River is popularly believed to be in Mount Osore, a suitably desolate and remote part of Aomori Prefecture in northern Japan.  

Real Sanzu Rivers in Japan
 in Kanra, Gunma (confluence with Shirakura River) 
 in Chōnan, Chiba (confluence with Ichinomiya River) 
 in Zaō, Miyagi (confluence with Nigori River)
 in Mutsu, Aomori (drains from Usori Lake)

See also
 Yomotsu Hirasaka
 Yomi
 Yama
 Yama (Buddhism)
 Naraka
 Ne-no-kuni
 Meido
  - The other side of the Sanzu River, opposite the Living World's side.  
 Bardo - Buddhist mythology
 Gjöll – Norse mythology
 Hitpun - Mandaeism
 Hubur – Mesopotamian mythology
 Styx – Greek mythology
 Vaitarna River (mythological) – Hinduism and Buddhism
 Naihe Bridge - the entrance and exit to the underworld in Taoism and Chinese folk beliefs; the ghosts must pass over this bridge before they can be reincarnated.

References

Locations in Buddhist mythology
Locations in Japanese mythology
Mythological rivers
Rivers of Gunma Prefecture
Rivers of Chiba Prefecture
Rivers of Miyagi Prefecture
Rivers of Aomori Prefecture
Rivers in Buddhism
Rivers of Japan
Asia in mythology
Afterlife places
Mythological places